Institut supérieur d'agriculture Rhône-Alpes (ISARA) a French engineering College created in 1968.

The school trains engineers in agronomy, agrifood and environment.

Located in Lyon, as well as in Avignon since 2017, the ISARA is a private higher education institution of general interest recognised by the State. The school is a member of the University of Lyon University Group.

References

External links
 ISARA

Engineering universities and colleges in France
Lyon
ISARA
Rhône-Alpes
Educational institutions established in 1968
1968 establishments in France